Lentinellus cochleatus, commonly known as the aniseed cockleshell, is a wood-inhabiting fungus. It has a mild aniseed odor and flavor. Like all species in its genus, it is inedible due to its bitterness.

References

External links
Medicinal Mushrooms description and medicinal properties
Roger's Mushrooms description

Russulales
Fungi of Europe
Inedible fungi